Krasny Bor is a rural locality (a village) in Borisoglebskoye Rural Settlement, Muromsky District, Vladimir Oblast, Russia. The population was 25 as of 2010.

Geography 
Krasny Bor is located 51 km northeast of Murom (the district's administrative centre) by road. Aleshunino is the nearest rural locality.

References 

Rural localities in Muromsky District